Vegreville was a provincial electoral district in Alberta, Canada, mandated to return a single member to the Legislative Assembly of Alberta from 1909 to 1963 and again from 1971 to 1993.

History

Boundary history
Vegreville was created from the northwest corner of the Vermilion district as part of the almost-doubling of seats in the Legislature in 1909. Over time, its boundaries were adjusted several times, shrinking to the area immediately surrounding the town of Vegreville.

In 1963, Vegreville was merged with some of the Bruce district to form Vegreville-Bruce, but in the redistribution that followed, the district was renamed Vegreville with little change in boundaries. The riding was finally abolished in 1993, mostly absorbed by Vegreville-Viking, with a small area transferred to Vermilion-Lloydminster.

Representation history
Vegreville (and Vegreville-Bruce) was mostly a bellwether riding, having been held by an opposition party only once until 1982. Its first MLA was James Bismark Holden, who had already served as MLA for Vermilion for the Liberals. He served one term in Vegreville and retired in 1913.

His successor was Joseph McCallum, who won Vegreville for the Liberals by a much smaller margin in 1913 and 1917 but nonetheless held the district for the government. However, in 1921, he was soundly defeated by United Farmers of Alberta candidate Archie Matheson in their party's rise to power. Matheson was a vocal backbencher in the UFA government, opposing his own government's stances on prohibition and eugenics, and aggressively advocating for local interests during his three terms.

However, Matheson was in turn soundly defeated by Social Credit candidate James McPherson when the UFA was swept out of power in 1935, placing third in the first round of voting. McPherson served only one term.

In 1940, Social Credit held the seat with candidate George Woytkiw winning on the second round. Matheson ran in this election as well in an attempt to re-take the seat, this time as a CCF candidate, but placed third again.

Woytkiw also served only one term, but Social Credit candidate Michael Ponich held the seat again in 1944, despite a strong challenge by the CCF. Ponich won again in a landslide in 1948, but faced another close race in 1952.

In 1955 Stanley Ruzycki defeated Ponich in the second round of voting to take the seat for the Co-Operative Commonwealth Federation. In response, the Social Credit government abolished instant-runoff voting in rural ridings and introduced first past the post voting across the province. Ruzycki was subsequently defeated by Social Credit candidate Alex Gordey in 1959.

After Gordey's first term, Vegreville was merged with Bruce, and he chose to run again in the new riding of Vegreville-Bruce. He served two terms there, and Vegreville was reinstated in 1971.

Running again in Vegreville, Gordey would be defeated along with Harry Strom's government by the Progressive Conservatives. John Batiuk won the seat by a significant margin, and went on to serve four terms, becoming the longest-serving MLA in the district's history.

When Batiuk chose not to run again in 1986, the open seat was picked up by New Democrat Derek Fox. He served two terms until the riding was abolished in 1993, and was defeated by future premier Ed Stelmach in the new riding of Vegreville-Viking. As of 2016, Fox is the last Alberta New Democrat to have held a rural seat for two successive terms.

Election results

1900s

|}

1910s

|}

|}

1920s

|}
For the 1926 election, the United Farmers government introduced alternative vote in rural constituencies. Three counts were necessary in Vegreville, as Matheson failed to win a majority on the first or second round.

|-
!colspan=6|Second count

|colspan=2|Neither
|align=right|486

|}
Final round swing represents gain from the first round. Overall swing is calculated from first preferences.

1930s

|}

|}
The source records a second count between McPherson and Gordon despite McPherson's majority result. This may be the result of an archiving error.

1940s

|-
!colspan=6|Second count

|colspan=2|Neither
|align=right|230

|}

|-
!colspan=6|Second count

|colspan=2|Neither
|align=right|417

|}

|}

1950s

|-
!colspan=6|Second count

|colspan=2|Neither
|align=right|648

|}

|-
!colspan=6|Second count

|colspan=2|Neither
|align=right|395

|}
After the 1955 election, the Social Credit government abolished alternative vote in rural districts and reintroduced first past the post. Vegreville was therefore won without a majority on the first round in 1959, and this change can also be seen in the dramatic drop in spoiled (incorrectly marked) ballots.

|}

1971 general election

1975 general election

1979 general election

1982 general election

1986 general election

1989 general election

Plebiscite results

1957 liquor plebiscite

On October 30, 1957 a stand-alone plebiscite was held province wide in all 50 of the then current provincial electoral districts in Alberta. The government decided to consult Alberta voters to decide on liquor sales and mixed drinking after a divisive debate in the Legislature. The plebiscite was intended to deal with the growing demand for reforming antiquated liquor control laws.

The plebiscite was conducted in two parts. Question A asked in all districts, asked the voters if the sale of liquor should be expanded in Alberta, while Question B asked in a handful of districts within the corporate limits of Calgary and Edmonton asked if men and woman were allowed to drink together in establishments.

Province wide Question A of the plebiscite passed in 33 of the 50 districts while Question B passed in all five districts. Vegreville voted in favour of the proposal by a solid majority. Voter turnout in the district was abysmal falling well under the province wide average of 46%.

Official district returns were released to the public on December 31, 1957. The Social Credit government in power at the time did not considered the results binding. However the results of the vote led the government to repeal all existing liquor legislation and introduce an entirely new Liquor Act.

Municipal districts lying inside electoral districts that voted against the Plebiscite were designated Local Option Zones by the Alberta Liquor Control Board and considered effective dry zones, business owners that wanted a license had to petition for a binding municipal plebiscite in order to be granted a license.

See also
List of Alberta provincial electoral districts
Vegreville, Alberta, a town in eastern Alberta

References

Further reading

External links
Elections Alberta
The Legislative Assembly of Alberta

Former provincial electoral districts of Alberta